Ramadasu is a 1964 Indian Telugu-language biographical film, based on the life of Kancharla Gopanna, produced and directed by V. Nagayya. It stars Nagayya, with N. T. Rama Rao, Akkineni Nageswara Rao, Sivaji Ganesan and Anjali Devi in special appearances, with music composed by Ashwathama. The blockbuster film has garnered the National Film Award for Best Feature Film in Telugu, and has garnered several state awards.

Plot
Kancherla Gopanna's uncles, Akkanna and Madanna are ministers in Golconda ruled by Tanisha. Ramadasu marries Akkanna's daughter Kamala. In Bhadrachalam, Gopanna meets Kabir, a Rama devotee who renames him Ramadasu. Impressed by his selfless service, Tanisha appoints Ramadasu as the Tehsildar, the tax collector of Bhadrachalam. Ramadasu spends the tax money to build a temple for Rama. The letter he sends explaining this does not reach the Tanisha, due to a plot hatched by the Dharmakarta. A furious Tanish has Ramadasu imprisoned, but on the day of his hanging, Lord Rama and Lakshmana appear in disguise before Tanisha, and pay him the amount due from Ramadasu. Tanisha realizes his folly and rushes to save Ramadasu from the gallows.

Cast
V. Nagayya as Kancharla Gopanna / Ramadasu
Gummadi as Kabir das
Relangi as Badi Panthulu 
Ramana Reddy as Ahmak Shah
C.S.R as Pratap Giri Panthulu
Mudigonda Lingamurthy as Madanna
A. V. Subba Rao as Akkanna
Pasala Surya Chandra Rao as Tanisha
Kannamba as Kamalamba
Rushyendramani as Shyamalamba
Tanguturi Suryakumari as Sitara Begam
Prabhavathi as Chand Bibi

Special appearances
N. T. Rama Rao as Lord Rama 
Akkineni Nageswara Rao as Lord Vishnu 
Sivaji Ganesan as Lakshmana 
Anjali Devi as Goddess Lakshmi

Soundtrack

Music composed by Aswadhama. Music released on HMV Audio Company.

Awards
National Film Awards
National Film Award for Best Feature Film in Telugu - 1964

Other
 VCDs & DVDs on - VOLGA Videos, Hyderabad

References 

1964 films
1960s Telugu-language films
Indian biographical films
Indian epic films
Hindu devotional films
History of India on film
1960s biographical films